The 1990 Virginia Slims of Houston was a women's tennis tournament played on outdoor clay courts at the Westside Tennis Club in Houston, Texas in the United States that was part of the Tier III category of the 1990 WTA Tour. It was the 20th edition of the tournament and was held from March 27 through April 1, 1990. Fourth-seeded Katerina Maleeva won the singles title and earned won $45,000 first-prize money.

Finals

Singles
 Katerina Maleeva defeated  Arantxa Sánchez Vicario 6–1, 1–6, 6–4
 It was Maleeva' first singles title of the year and the 9th of her career.

Doubles
The doubles event was cancelled due to rain delays.

References

External links
 ITF tournament edition details
 Tournament draws

Virginia Slims of Houston
Virginia Slims of Houston
Virginia Slims of Houston
Virginia Slims of Houston
Virginia Slims of Houston
Virginia Slims of Houston
Virginia Slims of Houston